Lizbeth Goodman is the Chair of Creative Technology Innovation and founder director of the SMARTlab Digital Media Institute and the MAGIC Multimedia & Games Innovation Centre, formerly at the University of East London, England, and elsewhere, now at University College Dublin in Dublin, Ireland.

Lizbeth Goodman founded the SMARTlab in the 1990s and directed that lab as it expanded at five different UK institutions: the Open University, the BBC, the University of Surrey, Central Saint Martins College of Art & Design, and the University of East London.

Goodman was previously at Central Saint Martins, part of the University of the Arts in London. She moved to the University of East London in 2005.

Lizbeth Goodman holds the Microsoft Community Affairs Senior Research Fellowship for her work on the Emergenc(i)es series of books on digital culture and people, published by MIT Press.

Selected books 
 Contemporary Feminist Theatres: To Each Her Own (Gender & Performance) by Lizbeth Goodman (Routledge, 1993). .
 Literature and Gender: An Introductory Textbook (Approaching Literature) by Lizbeth Goodman (Routledge, 1996). .
 Shakespeare, Aphra Behn and the Canon: An Introductory Textbook (Approaching Literature) by Lizbeth Goodman and W.R. Owens (Routledge, 1996). .
 Feminist Stages: Interviews with Women in Contemporary British Theatre (Contemporary Theatre Studies) by Lizbeth Goodman and Jane de Gay (Routledge, 1997). .
 The Routledge Reader in Gender and Performance by Lizbeth Goodman,  and Jane de Gay, editors (Routledge, 1998). .
 The Routledge Reader in Politics and Performance by Jane de Gay and Lizbeth Goodman, editors (Routledge, 2000). .

References

External links 
 Lizbeth Goodman web page at the University of East London
 Lizbeth Goodman, SmartLab and FutureLab, UK, at opening of DIU seminarium on Future learning, London, January 2010 video on Vimeo

Year of birth missing (living people)
Living people
BBC people
Academics of the Open University
Academics of the University of Surrey
Academics of Central Saint Martins
Academics of the University of East London
Academics of University College Dublin
British literary critics
British women literary critics
British social scientists
Gender studies academics
Cultural academics
British expatriates in Ireland
British mass media scholars